NGC 3382 is the name for two stars in the constellation Leo Minor. The object was discovered on April 5, 1874 by the Irish astronomer Lawrence Parsons.

References

External links 
 

Double stars
Leo Minor
3382